Gemmula damperierana is a species of sea snail, a marine gastropod mollusk in the family Turridae, the turrids.

Description
The length of the shell varies between 14 mm and 35 mm.

Distribution
This marine species occurs off Western Australia, the Philippines and in the South China Sea.

References

  Powell, A.W.B. 1964. The Family Turridae in the Indo-Pacific. Part 1. The Subfamily Turrinae. Indo-Pacific Mollusca 1: 227-346
 Kosuge, S. (1988) Report on the family Turridae collected along the North-western Coast of Australia (Gastropoda) (3) (Plate 47; text-figs. 1-15). Bulletin of the Institute of Malacology Tokyo, 2 (7), 118–123.
 Wilson, B. 1993. Australian Marine Shells. Prosobranch Gastropods. Kallaroo, Western Australia : Odyssey Publishing Vol. 1 408 pp. 
 Liu, J.Y. [Ruiyu] (ed.). (2008). Checklist of marine biota of China seas. China Science Press. 1267 pp.
 Li B. [Baoquan] & Li X. [Xinzheng]. (2008). Report on the turrid genera Gemmula, Lophiotoma and Ptychosyrinx (Gastropoda: Turridae: Turrinae) from the China seas. Zootaxa. 1778: 1-25.

External links
  Tucker, J.K. 2004 Catalog of recent and fossil turrids (Mollusca: Gastropoda). Zootaxa 682:1-1295.

damperierana
Gastropods described in 1964
Gastropods of Australia